Rynning is a surname. Notable people with the surname include:

Astri Rynning (1915–2006), Norwegian judge and politician
Carl Ingwart Theodor Rynning (1837–1892), Norwegian government official and politician
Chris Rynning (born 1967), Norwegian chief executive
Jens Rynning (1778–1857), Norwegian priest and public education advocate
Ole Rynning (1809–1838), Norwegian-born American emigrant pioneer and author
Thomas H. Rynning (1866–1941), United States Army officer